Francis Manuel Mac Allister (born 30 October 1995) is an Argentine professional footballer who plays as a midfielder for Rosario Central.

Career
Mac Allister, like his two brothers, started his career with Argentinos Juniors. Mac Allister's debut for the club came on 15 May 2016 in an Argentine Primera División draw with Lanús. He made a second appearance six days later, against Atlético de Rafaela, in a season which ended in relegation for Argentinos. In the following season, Mac Allister joined Boca Unidos of Primera B Nacional on loan. His first appearance for Boca was in a 0–0 with Flandria on 8 October, prior to scoring his first goal in November versus Independiente Rivadavia. He returned to Argentinos in 2017, going on to appear sixty-seven times.

In November 2020, Mac Allister signed for fellow Primera División side Talleres. In June 2022, Mac Allister moved to fellow league club Rosario Central.

Personal life
Francis Mac Allister has two brothers, Alexis and Kevin, who are also professional footballers. They are the sons of Carlos Mac Allister and nephews of Patricio Mac Allister.

Career statistics

Honours
Argentinos Juniors
Primera B Nacional: 2016–17

References

External links

1995 births
Living people
Footballers from Buenos Aires
Argentine people of Scottish descent
Argentine people of Irish descent
Argentine footballers
Association football midfielders
Argentine Primera División players
Primera Nacional players
Argentinos Juniors footballers
Boca Unidos footballers
Talleres de Córdoba footballers
Rosario Central footballers
Francis